Mesh & Lace is the debut studio album by English post-punk band Modern English. It was released on 10 April 1981, through record label 4AD. The album was reissued on CD in 1992 with seven bonus tracks.

Critical reception

Trouser Press panned the album, calling it "a load of monotonous droning and shouting by a precious art band 
oppressively weighed down by its self-conscious 4AD pretensions."

Vinyl LP track listing

CD track listing

Personnel
 Robbie Grey – vocals, production
 Gary McDowell – guitar, vocals, production
 Mick Conroy – bass guitar, vocals, production
 Stephen Walker – keyboards, production
 Richard Brown – drums, production

 Technical
 Ken Thomas – engineering
 Denis "BilBo" Blackham – mastering
 23 Envelope – album cover design

References

External links
 
 Mesh & Lace information at 4AD's official website

1981 debut albums
Modern English (band) albums
4AD albums
Post-punk albums by English artists